Qui Con Me ("Your Colors") is a song by the Chinese bel canto group Super Vocal, written by Roxanne Seeman, George Komsky and Ivo Moring.  The Italian lyrics were written by Saverio Principini with the Chinese lyrics were written by Cheng He (程何).

Composition and lyrics 
The original version of the song, My Heart, was written by George Komsky, Ivo Moring and Roxanne Seeman. Italian lyrics were written later by Saverio Principini.

Singer 2020 
In March 2020, during the global pandemic, Singer 2020 introduced Super Vocal, as Surprise Challengers.  Super Vocal chose to perform the song "Your Colors"  (Chinese: 你的色彩, Italian: Qui Con Me) with Italian lyrics, to express their blessings to Italy. It was premiered on the Singer 2020 "The Year of the Fight" stage by Super Vocal as a Chinese-Italian bilingual live performance.  The Mandarin lyrics were written by Cheng He. Super Vocal received the ranking of Surprise Success. The Weibo topic "Super Vocal Ni De Se Cai" (#声入人心男团你的彩色#) exceeded 40 million page views in 24 hours.

Ni De Se Cai 

Ni De Se Cai 你的色彩 is the Mandarin language studio recording by Super Vocal of the song Qui Con Me performed live on Singer 2020.  It was released by Decca China on March 27, 2020 as the first single from a studio album scheduled for release later in the year.

Music production 
Universal Music invited British producers to complete the recording through the cloud production model.  The song was arranged by Wu Qinglong 吴庆隆 and produced by British producer Nick Patrick.

Personnel 
Credits are adapted from Tidal.

 Goh Kheng Long - producer, recording arranger
 Ruth Ling - producer, vocal producer
 George Komsky - composer/lyricist
 Ivo Moring - composer/lyricist
 Roxanne Seeman - composer/lyricist
 Saverio Principini - Italian lyrics
 Cheng He - Chinese lyrics
 Cai Cheng Yu - singer

 Gao Tian He - singer
 Ju Hong Chuan - singer
 Tong Zhuo - singer
 Liu Yutong - vocal producer
 Zeng Rong - vocal producer
 Jim Lim - vocal arranger
 Simon Lee - English horn
 Pablo Calzado - percussion

Critical reception 
Hu Guangxin, All Media Reporter, Yangcheng Evening News described "beautiful, poetic and graphic text. The melody of the song is warm and healing without losing its momentum." 

Lin Mengyun of Hourly News, Quianjiang Evening News praised the song and performance writing "Cai Chengyu, Tong Zhuo, Gao Tianhe, and Ju Hongchuan use their highly infectious voices and tacit cooperation with each other. They use their beautiful voices and popular singing methods to let the audience feel the charm of the music while also painting the bright colors of springtime when everything comes to life."

George Komsky version 
Ukrainian-born American tenor George Komsky, a composer of "Qui Con Me", released his version as a single on July 2, 2021.  It is the title track of a two song EP with Vivo Per Lei appearing as the second track.

References 

2020 songs
2020 singles
Macaronic songs
Songs written by Roxanne Seeman
Italian-language songs
Italian songs
Mandarin-language songs
Decca Records singles